Hidden Places is a 2006 American made-for-television romantic drama film. It premiered on January 28, 2006 on Hallmark Channel. The film was directed by Yelena Lanskaya. The teleplay was by Robert Tate Miller and was based on the novel by Lynn Austin.

Plot
When Eliza (Sydney Penny) loses her father-in-law she is left to raise two children, continue work on an unharvested orange crop, and maintain a heavy mortgage. She begins to lose faith until her Aunt Batty (Shirley Jones) persuades her to persevere. Suddenly a mysterious stranger called Gabe (Jason Gedrick) turns up and helps Eliza with the harvest just in time to stop the bank from taking over. The more Eliza learns about Gabe, the more she realizes she loves him.

Cast
 Sydney Penny as Eliza
 Shirley Jones as Aunt Batty
 Jason Gedrick as Gabe Harper
 Barry Corbin as Sheriff
 Logan Arens as Luke
 Carlie Westerman as Becky
 Time Winters as Mr. Kornhaus
 James Keane as Mr. Jennings
 Tom Bosley as Wakefield

Award nominations
Shirley Jones' performance received two nominations: an Emmy award for Outstanding Supporting Actress In A Miniseries Or Made For TV Movie and also a Screen Actors Guild Award for Outstanding Performance By A Female Actor In A Miniseries Or TV Movie.

External links
 Hidden Places at Hallmark Channel
 
 

2006 television films
2006 films
2006 romantic drama films
American romantic drama films
Hallmark Channel original films
American drama television films
2000s English-language films
2000s American films